"Mo Money Mo Problems" is a song by American rapper The Notorious B.I.G., released through Bad Boy Records and Arista Records, which impacted US mainstream radio stations on July 15, 1997, as the second single from his second and final studio album, Life After Death (1997). It was written by the Notorious B.I.G., Steven Jordan, Mason Betha, and Sean Combs, while the latter also produced the song. It contains a sample and an interpolation of "I'm Coming Out" by Diana Ross, for which Bernard Edwards and Nile Rodgers are also credited as songwriters. The song features guest vocals from Mase and Sean "Puff Daddy" Combs, and featured an uncredited hook sung by Kelly Price.

Released posthumously, "Mo Money Mo Problems" topped the Billboard Hot 100 for two weeks in 1997, replacing "I'll Be Missing You" at the top of the chart, Puff Daddy's own tribute to the rapper. The song is Notorious B.I.G.'s second posthumous number-one single, following "Hypnotize", making him the only artist in Hot 100 history to have two number-one singles posthumously. It was the sixth song to hit number one posthumously for a credited artist. It received a nomination for the Grammy Award for Best Rap Performance by a Duo or Group in 1998.

Based on airplay and chart success, the song is considered one of the most popular singles in hip hop history. In 2021, Samoan Australian hip hop group No Money Enterprise covered the song on Australian youth broadcaster Triple J's Like a Version segment.

Critical reception
Ralph Tee from Music Weeks RM rated "Mo Money Mo Problems" five out of five, picking it as Hip Hop Tune of the Week. He wrote, "Biggie's profile could not be greater right now, particularly in the States. (...) It's the one true light moment on an extremely dark album and brilliantly utilises the Diana Ross sample from 'I'm Coming Out', cleverly weaved into some serious big beats, scratching and guest appearances by Puff Daddy and Mase. Biggie delivers his rap in the natural self assured way he always did so well, the chorus being as infectious as they get on the song from the album which always screamed of a hit from day one."

Commercial performance
"Mo Money Mo Problems" was able to top the Billboard Hot 100 for two weeks, giving Biggie his second number one hit in the US. The song hit number one after he had died. It was preceded by "I'll Be Missing You" by Puff Daddy featuring 112 and Faith Evans (meaning that Puff Daddy spent 13 weeks in a row at the top of the Hot 100) and was succeeded by "Honey" by Mariah Carey, which was also co-produced by Puff Daddy. "Mo Money Mo Problems" also reached number six on the UK Singles Chart.

Music video
The accompanying music video for "Mo Money Mo Problems", directed by Hype Williams, featured Mase and Combs in futuristic locations designed by Ron Norsworthy, including a tunnel lined with fluorescent lamps and a stark white chamber with pressurized air blowing out of the floor, allowing the two to float in midair. This video is also famous for the red shiny jackets that are worn by Combs and Mase. The "air chamber" also had a video screen showing, at first, images of Kelly Price lip-synching to the sample of Diana Ross' voice and singing the song's chorus. During the final verse, which the Notorious B.I.G. performed, Mase and Puffy looked on as the video screen showed archival footage of B.I.G. performing, it ran at a speed so that the footage seemed to sync with B.I.G.'s vocals; since the rapper had died just prior to the release of Life After Death, and well before the filming of the video, this was the only way to have him appear in the video. The video features appearances from Sheek Louch of The LOX, Riddick Bowe, Stevie J, and Nashiem Myrick.

The video also has a short story, which is about how Combs was competing in a golf tournament and gained help from the spirit of The Notorious B.I.G, who helps him win the tournament. This was a reaction to the newly popular success of Tiger Woods. The music video was released in July 1997.

MuchMoreMusic ranked "Mo Money Mo Problems" number 31 on Listeds "40 Most Memorable Videos Pt. 1 & 2" for its flashy wardrobe, and use of syncing old footage with the lyrics. VH1 ranked the song number 63 as one of the "100 Greatest Songs of the 90s".

Track listing
 CD single'''
 "Mo Money Mo Problems"  Produced by Sean Combs (radio mix) – 4:12
 "Lovin You Tonight" (radio mix) – 5:07
 "Mo Money Mo Problems" (instrumental) – 4:12
 "Mo Money Mo Problems" (Razor-N-Go Club mix, short version) – 4:09
 "Mo Money Mo Problems" (Razor-N-Go Club mix, long version) – 10:33

Charts

Weekly charts

Year-end charts

Decade-end charts

Certifications

Release history

No Money Enterprise version

Samoan Australian hip hop group No Money Enterprise covered the song for Australian youth broadcaster Triple J's Like a Version segment on 26 November 2021. The cover was digitally released the following week, on 3 December 2021.

According to NME Australias Jackson Langford, they "remained sonically faithful to Biggie's original version", with member Tommy OT rapping Mase's verse, whilet Randy OT $avag.e and OT Stallyon added their own original verses to the song. The performance also included a live drummer and a female backing vocalist. Australian popular culture website Junkees David James Young ranked the cover at number 32 out of 38 in his list of the best Like a Version'' covers of 2021, stating "[the] Biggie classic doesn't quite meld with the Enterprise's style."

References

External links
 
 

1997 singles
1996 songs
The Notorious B.I.G. songs
Bad Boy Records singles
Arista Records singles
Billboard Hot 100 number-one singles
Funk-rap songs
Mase songs
Music videos directed by Hype Williams
No Money Enterprise songs
Sean Combs songs
Songs released posthumously
Songs written by Mase
Songs written by the Notorious B.I.G.
Songs written by Sean Combs